Dolichestola vittipennis is a species of beetle in the family Cerambycidae. It was described by Breuning in 1948. It is known from Brazil.

References

External links

Desmiphorini
Beetles described in 1948